Caleb Reginald McLaughlin (born October 13, 2001) is an American actor. He gained recognition for playing Lucas Sinclair in the Netflix series Stranger Things (2016–present). McLaughlin began his career on the Broadway stage as Young Simba in the musical The Lion King followed by small roles in television. Following his breakthrough with Stranger Things, he appeared in the films High Flying Bird (2019) and Concrete Cowboy (2020), his first starring feature film role. His work also includes the miniseries The New Edition Story (2017) and various television voice acting roles.

Early life
Caleb Reginald McLaughlin was born on October 13, 2001 in Carmel, New York. He was born to parents April and Corey McLaughlin. He attended Kent Primary School and later attended George Fischer Middle School for one year. He studied dance for a year at Happy Feet Dance School in Carmel, New York and then attended Seven Star School of Performing Arts in Brewster Hill, New York for one year. He then studied at The Harlem School of the Arts under Aubrey Lynch, former Lion King producer.

Career 

McLaughlin's first acting role was as a child in the opera Lost in the Stars in Cooperstown, New York at the Glimmerglass Opera House. His first starring role was on Broadway as Young Simba in The Lion King musical (2012–14). He then went on to have guest-starring roles in television series such as Law & Order: Special Victims Unit, Unforgettable, Forever, What Would You Do?, and Shades of Blue. In 2016, McLaughlin's breakthrough role came with his portrayal of Lucas Sinclair in the hit Netflix series Stranger Things (2016–present). In 2017, he was a nominee for the BET YoungStars Award, and in 2018 he won Outstanding Performance by a Youth at the NAACP Image Awards. In 2020, McLaughlin made his feature film debut in Concrete Cowboy, co-starring with Idris Elba and Jharrel Jerome, which received positive reviews. In December 2020, McLaughlin was included as an honoree in Forbes 30 Under 30 Class of 2021 list in the field of Hollywood and Entertainment.

Advocacy 
McLaughlin has spearheaded the social media campaigns #EmbraceYourFace and #BeYourBiggestFan, promoting healthy body image, positivity and self-esteem. McLaughlin has stated: "Feeling good about yourself is healthy. It always starts with you first, before it goes to anyone else... You have to learn to love and appreciate yourself and take that time to do it." In 2020, McLaughlin also encouraged people to vote in the 2020 US presidential election, posting a video on his official Instagram account with links to the non-profit organization Vote.org.

Filmography

Film

Television

Theater

Music videos

Awards and nominations

References

External links
 
 

2001 births
Living people
African-American male actors
Male actors from New York City
American male child actors
American male film actors
American male television actors
21st-century American male actors
American male voice actors
21st-century African-American people